Lađanica (Cyrillic: Лађаница) is a settlement in the municipality of Konjic, Bosnia and Herzegovina; it is the eastern hamlet of the village of Glavatičevo.

Demographics 
According to the 2013 census, its population was 47, all Bosniaks.

References

Populated places in Konjic
Glavatičevo